Derevenskiy Bezbozhnik (translation of the name: «The Rural Godless») was an illustrated magazine, an organ of the Centre Soviet and Moscow Oblast Soviet of the League of the Militant Godless.

The magazine was created by the Moscow Committee of the All-Union Communist Party (b). The magazine was published in Moscow from April 1928 to November 1932. Since 1 July 1930 Derevenskiy Bezbozhnik became an organ of the Centre Soviet and Moscow Oblast Soviet of the League of the Militant Godless. First, the magazine came out once, then twice a month, with a circulation of 5 to 50 thousand copies. The magazine covered issues of the anti-religious movement during the period of collectivization. Pyotr Krasikov, Yemelyan Yaroslavsky, Demyan Bedny, Dmitry Moor and others collaborated in the magazine. Among the materials published in the magazine, a large place was occupied by the messages of rural correspondents.

See also 

 Bezbozhnik (newspaper)
 Bezbozhnik u Stanka
 Council for Religious Affairs
 Persecutions of the Catholic Church and Pius XII
 Persecution of Christians in the Soviet Union
 Persecution of Muslims in the former USSR
 Religion in the Soviet Union
 State atheism
 USSR anti-religious campaign (1928–1941)

References

Notes

 Атеистический словарь / [Абдусамедов А. И., Алейник Р. М., Алиева Б. А. и др. ; под общ. ред. М. П. Новикова]. - 2-е изд., испр. и доп. - Москва : Политиздат, 1985. - 512 с.; 20 см / С. 124
 Безбожник / Православная энциклопедия / Т. 4, С. 444-445 
 Воинствующее безбожие в СССР за 15 лет. 1917-1932 : сборник / Центральный совет Союза воинствующих безбожников и Институт философии Коммунистической академии ; под редакцией М. Енишерлова, А. Лукачевского, М. Митина. - Москва : ОГИЗ : Государственное антирелигиозное издательство, 1932. - 525, (2) с. : ил., портр.; 22 см. / С. 390

Magazines established in 1928
1932 disestablishments in the Soviet Union
Magazines published in Moscow
1928 establishments in the Soviet Union
Magazines disestablished in 1932
Monthly magazines published in Russia
Atheism publications
Magazines published in the Soviet Union
Russian-language magazines
Propaganda in the Soviet Union
Anti-religious campaign in the Soviet Union
Anti-Christian sentiment in Europe
Anti-Christian sentiment in Asia
Propaganda newspapers and magazines
Persecution of Muslims
Religious persecution by communists
Anti-Islam sentiment in the Soviet Union